Berke is a given name and surname. Notable people with the name include:

Given name
Berke Khan (died 1266), a ruler of the Golden Horde
Berke Özer (born 2000), Turkish footballer

Surname
Andy Berke, a Democratic State Senator in Tennessee
Balázs Berke, a Slovene poet, writer and Lutheran priest in Hungary, in the Slovene March
Deborah Berke (born 1954), American architect and academic
Ferenc Berke, (c. 1764–1841), a Hungarian Slovene Lutheran
Joseph Berke, an American psychotherapist
Steve Berke (born 1981), American cannabis activist
Von Berke, an old noble family in Vas County (nowadays: Prekmurje, Slovenia)
William Berke (1903–1958), an American film director, producer and screenwriter

See also
Berk (name), given name and surname
Birke, given name and surname
Burke, given name and surname